Wingate High School may refer to:
George W. Wingate High School in Brooklyn, New York City
Wingate High School (New Mexico) in Wingate, New Mexico